CP-1414S is an experimental drug first made by a team in Germany. It is a benzodiazepine derivative. CP-1414S is a 1,5-benzodiazepine, with the nitrogen atoms located at positions 1 and 5 of the diazepine ring, and so is most closely related to other 1,5-benzodiazepines such as clobazam.

CP-1414S has primarily anxiolytic and anticonvulsant effects. Its potency is roughly equal to that of clobazam, but with more pronounced sedation.

See also
Benzodiazepine

References

GABAA receptor positive allosteric modulators
Lactams
Nitrobenzodiazepines
Experimental drugs